The Great Australian Cookbook is an Australian television series based on the similarly named cookbook created by Reg Mombassa in collaboration with Kylie Kwong, Charmaine Solomon, George Calombaris and Maggie Beer. The television series features 22 of Australia's greatest cooks, amongst whom Matt Moran, Maggie Beer, Paul West and Darren Robertson, over 11 episodes.

These cooks, from top restaurateurs to local heroes, invites us into their homes and workplaces as they cook for their loved ones.

Additional to the series the Lifestyle Channel has more information on the cooks and the recipes on their website.

Episodes

Series 1 
 Matt Stone & Maggie Beer
 Gilbert Lau & Darren Robertson
 Matt Moran & Rayleen Brown
 Victor & Ev Liong & Nick Holloway
 Carol & Sharon Salloum & Peter Russell-Clarke
 Matt Wilkinson & Simmone Logue
 Ronni Kahn & Paul West
 Merle Parrish & Peter Gilmore 
 Ross O'meara & Anna Polyviou
 Frank Camorra & Clayton Donovan
 Alla Wolf-Tasker & Rodney Dunn

References

Australian cooking television series